The 1913 college football season had no clear-cut champion, with the Official NCAA Division I Football Records Book listing Auburn, Chicago, and Harvard as having been selected national champions. All three teams finished with undefeated records. Chicago and Harvard officially claim national championships for the 1913 season.

Chicago was also the champion of the Western Conference, Missouri was champion of the Missouri Valley Intercollegiate Athletic Association (MVIAA), and Colorado won the Rocky Mountain Athletic Conference.

Conference and program changes

Conference changes 
 One new conference began play in 1913:
 Inter-Normal Athletic Conference of Wisconsin – active NCAA Division III conference now known as the Wisconsin Intercollegiate Athletic Conference

Membership changes

Conference standings

Major conference standings

Independents

Minor conferences

Minor conference standings

Awards and honors

All-Americans 

The consensus All-America team included:

Statistical leaders 
 Player scoring most points: Johnny Spiegel, Washington & Jefferson, 127
 Passing yards leader: Gus Dorais, Notre Dame, 510+
 Player scoring most field goals: Charles Brickley, Harvard, 13

See also 
 1913 Southern Intercollegiate Athletic Association football season

References